Charles Francis Osborn (1847–1923) was a member of the Wisconsin State Assembly.

Biography
Osborn was born on March 16, 1847, in Ashtabula, Ohio. In 1851, he moved to Darlington, Wisconsin.

His father, Sylvester W. Osborn, and brother-in-law, Philo A. Orton, were also members of the Assembly.

Career
Osborn was a member of the Assembly during the 1889 and 1891 sessions. In 1880, he had been elected Mayor of Darlington. Additionally, Osborn was city attorney of Darlington and county judge of Lafayette County, Wisconsin. He was a Republican.

Osborn died in the summer of 1923 in San Pedro, California, where he had gone a few months prior for his health. His funeral was held in Darlington.

References

1847 births
1923 deaths
Mayors of places in Wisconsin
Politicians from Ashtabula, Ohio
People from Darlington, Wisconsin
Republican Party members of the Wisconsin State Assembly
Wisconsin state court judges
Wisconsin city attorneys
County judges in the United States
19th-century American lawyers
19th-century American politicians